War Made Easy: How Presidents & Pundits Keep Spinning Us to Death is a 2007 American anti-war documentary film written and directed by Loretta Alper and Jeremy Earp, based on the book of the same name by Norman Solomon. The film is produced by Alper and narrated by Sean Penn. It premiered in New York City on May 14, 2007, before a limited release on August 24, 2007.

Synopsis
The film attempts to expose how the American government over 50 years has tried to strum up war effort using the media as a tool. "War Made Easy gives special attention to parallels between the Vietnam war and the war in Iraq."

Reception
On Rotten Tomatoes, War Made Easy has an approval rating of 88%, based on 16 reviews, with an average rating of 7.3/10. Metacritic assigned the film a score of 57 out of 100, based on 5 critics, indicating "mixed or average reviews".

The New York Times columnist Jeannette Catsoulis described War Made Easy as "cinematically inert if ultimately persuasive". V.A. Musetto of the New York Post criticized the film as "conventional and one-sided". Aaron Hillis wrote for The Village Voice that the film is "sobering, straightforward, and a bit drab, but... it's also an entirely nonpartisan endeavor". Variety critic Dennis Harvey credited "Solomon's astute onscreen analysis" for driving the film.

References

External links
 

2007 films
2007 documentary films
2000s American films
2000s English-language films
2000s war films
Anti-war films
American war films
American documentary films about politics
Documentary films about American politics
Documentary films about presidents of the United States
Documentary films about war
Documentary films about journalism
Films based on non-fiction books